Rod Garossino (born June 7, 1963) is a Canadian retired ice dancer.  Partnering his sister Karyn Garossino, he competed in the 1988 Winter Olympics and won the gold medal at the 1989 Canadian Figure Skating Championships.

Garossino was born in Didsbury, Alberta.

Competitive highlights
(with Karyn Garossino)

References

1963 births
Living people
Canadian male ice dancers
Figure skaters at the 1988 Winter Olympics
Olympic figure skaters of Canada
People from Didsbury, Alberta
World Junior Figure Skating Championships medalists
20th-century Canadian people
21st-century Canadian people